Nevett is a surname. Notable people with the surname include:

Billy Nevett (1906–1992), English flat racing jockey
Elijah Nevett (born 1944), American football player
Lisa Nevett (born 1965), English archaeologist

See also
Nevitt, given name and surname